This is a list of Buddhist temples, monasteries, stupas, and pagodas in Canada for which there are Wikipedia articles, sorted by location.

British Columbia
 Birken Forest Buddhist Monastery
 International Buddhist Temple, Richmond
 Jodo Shinshu Buddhist Temples of Canada
 Ling Yen Mountain Temple
 Thrangu Monastery (Richmond, British Columbia)

Nova Scotia
 Gampo Abbey

Ontario
 Fo Guang Shan Temple, Toronto Toronto Branch, Mississauga
 Mahamevnawa Buddhist Monastery (Sri Lankan)
 Toronto Zen Centre
 Zen Centre of Ottawa

See also
 Buddhism in Canada
 List of Buddhist temples

Notes

External links

 BuddhaNet's Comprehensive Directory of Buddhist Temples sorted by country
 Buddhactivity Dharma Centres database

 
 
Canada
Buddhist temples